The Hall–Chaney House in Milwaukie, Oregon was built in 1916 and was listed on the National Register of Historic Places in 1988.

It was designed by architects Lawrence and Holford in Mediterranean style architecture.  Its NRHP nomination explains that architect-designed fine detailing in the interior includes arched windows and door openings, a central stairwell with "a beautifully carved rail and turned balusters", "ornately carved mantelpieces, built-in book cases, niches, and wood panelling."

An architecturally compatible swimming pool addition was added in 1923.

References

Houses on the National Register of Historic Places in Oregon
Houses completed in 1916
Mediterranean Revival architecture
National Register of Historic Places in Clackamas County, Oregon
Milwaukie, Oregon
Houses in Clackamas County, Oregon
1916 establishments in Oregon